Aromanian settlements can be found across the southern Balkan peninsula. They are populated solely by or a large proportion of Aromanians. Below is a list of the settlements that were either founded by Aromanians or are inhabited by a large number or strong Aromanian populations.

List of settlements

Muzachia region

The Muzachia region is an area in western Albania which encompasses parts of the Fier, Tirana and Durrës counties. It has a large Aromanian population spread across many villages. The Aromanian inhabitants of Muzachia are referred to as Muzachiars or Muzachirenji in Aromanian.
 Tirana (in the latest Albanian census, Tirana had the highest number of Aromanians in Albania, although Aromanians form a negligible percentage of the population)
 Kavajë
 Divjakë
 Elbasan
 Fier
 Patos
 Kosovë
 Ardenicë 
 Portëz
 Perlat
 Beshisht
 Cerkovinë
 Çipllak
 Grabian
 Grabova e Sipërme
 Gradishtë
 Jubë
 Kalasë
 Koshova
 Kryegjatë
 Libofshë
 Moravë 
 Përparim
 Pobrat 
 Poshnjë
 Shtyllas
 Skrofotinë
 Stan-Karbunarë
 Xhyrinë
 Zhepë

Epirus region
The Epirus region encompasses northwestern Greece and southern Albania.

 Berat
 Vlorë  
 Selenicë  
 Kotë
 Gjirokastër 
 Andon Poci 
 Humelicë  
 Palokastër 
 Hundëkuq
 Labovë
 Karjan 
 Kakoz 
 Gjat  
 Erind 
 Nokovë
 Mingul
 Këllëz  
 Dhoksat 
 Qestorat
 Valare 
 Stegopul   
 Suhë 
 Saraqinisht
 Selckë
 Leusë
 Sqepur  
 Poliçan  
 Skore 
 Zagoria  
 Topovë  
 Ndëran
 Xarrë
 Shkallë
 Delvinë
 Kardhikaq
 Bajkaj
 Stjar
 Igoumenitsa
 Paramythia  
 Filiates
 Arta
 Agrinio
 Përmet  
 Frashër
 Leshicë
 Badëlonjë
 Biovizhdë
 Çarshovë
 Draçovë
 Hoshevë
 Kosinë
 Kutal
 Vllaho-Psillotarë
 Gërmenj
 Ioannina
 Delvinaki
 Kefalovryso
 Vovousa
 Smenos
 Asproklisi

Pindus
One of the largest population of Aromanians in the Balkans is concentrated in the Pindus Mountains. These people are referred to as Pindians or Pindenji in Aromanian. The Aromanians have traditionally formed a majority population in this area. These populations were the subjects of two failed, Italian-sponsored attempts at creating an autonomous Aromanian statelet in the area, with the Principality of Pindus in World War I and the so-called "Roman Legion" in World War II.

 Agia Paraskevi
 Amarantos
 Ampelochori
 Anilio
 Anthousa
 Armata
 Avdella
 Chrysomilea
 Dessi
 Distrato
 Doliana
 Elatochori
 Elefthero
 Flampourari
 Fourka 
 Fteri
 Gardiki
 Glykomilea
 Grevena
 Greveniti
 Haliki
 Iliochori
 Kalarites
 Tzoumerkon
 Kaminia
 Kastaniani
 Kastania
 Katafyto
 Kipourio
 Klino
 Konitsa
 Korydallos
 Kranea
 Laista
 Makrino
 Malakasi
 Matsouki
 Megali Kerasia
 Metsovo
 Milea
 Mouria
 Nea Zoi
 Orthovouni
 Palaioselli
 Panagia
 Parakalamos
 Pefki
 Perivoli
 Pertouli
 Pirra
 Samarina
 Skamneli
 Smixi
 Syrrako 
 Tsepelovo
 Tristeno
 Trygona
 Vasiliko
 Vissani
 Votonossi
 Votnossi
 Vovousa
 Vrysochori

Gramos
The Gramos Mountains in the northern part of the Epirus region of the Balkan peninsula. Many Aromanian settlements are concentrated in this area which is shared by both Greece and Albania. Gramustians or Yrãmushcianji as they are referred to by Aromanians, make up a large proportion of the population there.

 Aetomilitsa
 Argos Orestiko
 Dendrohori
 Fousia
 Gramos
 Ieropigi
 Kleisoura
 Linotopion
 Milohorion
 Llëngë 
 Grabovë e Sipërme
 Niçë
 Shipskë
 Nikolicë
 Dardhë
 Arrëz
 Veterniko
 Vlasti

Macedonia region
A large proportion of Aromanians can be found in the region of Macedonia, which is shared by Albania, Greece, North Macedonia, and Bulgaria (region of Pirin Macedonia).

The city of Moscopole was once home to the largest Aromanian population in the world. It was the cultural and commercial center of the Aromanians with a population of over 60,000 people. The city was razed to the ground by Ali Pasha in 1788 causing an exodus of Aromanian people across the Balkans. Many of these ended up in what would become North Macedonia, Albania and Greece. The largest concentration of these were in the Pelister region of North Macedonia, the city of Kruševo and around the Prespa Lakes. The Moscopolitans of the Moscopoleanji as they are known in Aromanian form one of the largest populations of Aromanians today. They speak the Moscopolean dialect of Aromanian and the descendants of the Moscopolean's in Krusevo are today a fully recognised minority group under the constitutional law of North Macedonia.

 Moscopole (or )
 Korçë
 Floq
 Vithkuq 
 Drenovë
 Maliq
 Dishnicë
 Plasë
 Boboshticë
 Kamenice
 Kruševo
 Bitola
 Agios Germanos
 Arilevo
 Dolna Belica
 Drosopigi 
 Marmaras
 Flampouro
 Gopeš
 Gorna Belica
 Jankovec
 Kallithea
 Kruševo
 Krystallopigi
 Magarevo
 Malovište
 Medovon
 Milohorion
 Moschochori
 Lechovo
 Nižepole
 Nymfaio
 Ohrid  
 Patima
 Pili
 Resen
 Trnovo
 Vlasti
 Pipilista
 Vrontero
 Thessaloniki
 Kozani 
 Kavala
 Ano Poroia
 Arzach
 Bratsigovo 
 Bozhdovo
 Štip
 Kočani
 Čatal
 Dorkovo
 Emirica
 Gevgelia
 Irakleia
 Kalini Kamen
 Karamandra
 Vrbica
 Kratovo
 Kumanovo
 Lisec
 Lopen
 Lopovo
 Lozovo
 Ovcepole
 Pazardzhik
 Popovi livadi
 Peshtera
 Ponikva
 Radovistea
 Shatravo
 Sofia
 Strumski Chiflik
 Sveti Nikole
 Tito Veles
 Tsepina
 Vroica

Mount Vermion
 Agios Pavlos
 Ano Grammatiko
 Ano Vermio
 Kato Vermio
 Kedrona
 Naousa
 Polla Nera
 Seli
 Stenimachos
 Veria
 Megala Livadia
 Xirolivado

Thessaly-Mount Olympus area
This region is home to the most southerly population of Aromanians in the Balkans, with a prominent presence during the late Middle Ages. The Farsherots or the Fãrshãrots as they are known in Aromanian make a substantial percentage of the region's inhabitants.  
 Larissa regional unit
 Farsala
 Trikala
 Kalabaka
 Volos
 Almyros
 Anthotopos
 Makrychori
 Mikri Perivoli
 Neriada
 Parapotamos
 Sesklo
 Tyrnavos
 Velestinon
 Vlachogiano
 Kalochori Larisa

Mount Olympus
 Argyropouli
 Falana
 Karitsa
 Kokkinopilos
 Leivadi
 Rodia

Romania
 Dobruja
 Constanța  
 Săcele
 Ovidiu
 Castelu
 Medgidia
 Cogealac
 Tariverde
 Agigea
 Techirghiol
 Beidaud
 Sarighiol de Deal
 Tulcea
 Lăstuni
 Stejaru
 Caugagia
 Ceamurlia de Jos
 Ceamurlia de Sus
 Nicolae Bălcescu
 Camena
 Vasile Alecsandri
 Baia
 Lunca
 Casimcea
 Panduru
 Sinoe
 Mihai Viteazu 
 Cobadin
 Slobozia
 Urziceni
 Călărasi 
 Modelu 
 Voluntari
 Vădeni

Maps

See also
 Vlachs
 History of Aromanians
 Aromanians in North Macedonia
 List of prominent Aromanians

References 

 
Aromanian